The Van Hulthem Manuscript is a masterpiece of medieval Dutch literature, probably compiled in the Duchy of Brabant. It contains over 200 stories from across the Low Countries.

The manuscript is named after its last private owner, Charles van Hulthem of Ghent. It is now in the collection of the Royal Library of Belgium.

This manuscript contains the only known versions of the famous abele spelen ("able plays"), some of the earliest secular drama surviving from medieval Europe.

References

External links
Volume 1 of a 1999 edition of the manuscript (online scans at the Digital Library for Dutch Literature).

Middle Dutch literature
Dutch manuscripts
Medieval manuscripts
Manuscripts in the Royal Library of Belgium